Lightning Strikes Twice is a 1934 American comedy film directed by Ben Holmes from a screenplay by Joseph A. Fields and John Grey. It stars Ben Lyon, Thelma Todd, and Pert Kelton. A print is held by the Library of Congress.

Plot

Cast
 Ben Lyon as Steven 'Steve' Brewster
 Thelma Todd as Judith 'Judy' Nelson
 Pert Kelton as Fay, the Fan Dancer
 Laura Hope Crews as Aunt Jane Madison
 Richard 'Skeets' Gallagher as Wally Richards (as 'Skeets' Gallagher)
 Chick Chandler as Marty Hicks
 Walter Catlett as Gus
 Jonathan Hale as Capt. Hobart Nelson (as John Hale)
 Margaret Armstrong as Martha, the Housekeeper
 John Davidson as Phillips, the Butler
 Fred Kelsey as Detective Dugan
 Edgar Dearing as Police Lt. Foster
 Roger Gray as Officer Casey

References

External links 
 
 
 
 

1934 films
1934 comedy films
American black-and-white films
American comedy mystery films
1930s comedy mystery films
RKO Pictures films
Films directed by Ben Holmes
1930s English-language films
1930s American films